Ako Mitchell is a British-American actor and filmmaker. Ako directed and co-wrote the short film "I'm in the corner with the bluebells" part of the international shorts competition at the 2014 Toronto International Film Festival. Ako recently played "Klook" in Klook’s Last Stand at London's Park Theatre where he received an Off West End Awards Best Actor nomination. He also recently played esteemed British actor Lenny Henry's brother in Fences in the West End. Ako has also worked at London's Donmar Warehouse and played opposite Patina Miller in Sister Act at The London Palladium.

Ako's credits also include: 
 Pilot in Nick Lloyd Webber's The Little Prince (Savoy Theatre);
 Mitch in Spelling Bee (Donmar Warehouse); 
 Mufasa in The Lion King (Lyceum Theatre-West End); 
 Coalhouse Walker Jr. in Ragtime (Charing Cross Theatre); 
 Dennis in Lake Placid: The Final Chapter (Film);
 Wood Man in Hilda (British TV Show);
 Charlie in Doctor Strange in the Multiverse of Madness (Film).

Ako also Co-produced the documentary film 500 Years Later, a winner at the Pan-African Film Festival, Black Berlin International Cinema and Harlem International Film Festival.

In December 2017 he played "Nicely-Nicely Johnson" in Guys and Dolls at the Royal Exchange, Manchester. The production was directed by Michael Buffong.

On 9 December 2020, he played "Papa Who" in NBC's live production of Dr. Seuss' The Grinch Musical! alongside
Matthew Morrison, Denis O'Hare, Booboo Stewart and Amelia Minto, who played The Grinch, Old Max, Young Max and Cindy Lou Who, respectively.

References

External links
 www.birdbrothers.co.uk

Living people
Year of birth missing (living people)
American male stage actors
Male actors from Chicago
American people of Ghanaian descent
Place of birth missing (living people)